Barnstaple Rugby Football Club was established in 1877 and is a rugby union club based in Barnstaple, Devon. The club's first team play in the National League 2 West, the fourth tier of the English rugby union league system, following promotion from the South West Premier in 2019–20. The club colours are red and white and their nickname is Barum.

The first team are called the Chiefs, and there are also 2nd and 3rd teams (Athletic and Buccaneers), a number of youth teams from under-7s to under-18s (colts), and a girls side.  The clubs rivals are Bideford RFC, with an annual festive fixture played between the sides that attracts good crowds, despite the clubs currently playing in different divisions.

History
Barnstaple Rugby Football Club was officially founded in 1877 at a meeting held at the Fortesque hotel. The first Chairman of the club was Mr W. A. Bilney, the first captain Mr W. H. TOLLER, and games in the early days were played at Rumsam. The club won  silverware in 1894 when they claimed the Devon League Cup, becoming one of the strongest clubs in the county, forming a rivalry with Devonport Albion, and producing two international players for England - Charlies Harper and Charles Thomas. During the 1896–97 season Barnstaple were crowned 'Champions of the West' and claimed notable victories against the likes of Llanelli and Saracens.  In 1921 Barnstaple moved from Rumsam to the clubs present Pottington Road Ground at Pottington Road.

With the advent of the leagues in 1987, Barnstaple found themselves placed at tier 6 of the English rugby union league system in what was then known as South West 2. By the mid-1990s the club had achieved promotion to South West 1 where they would remain for over a decade. During this period they also became one of the top club sides in Devon winning five county cups in this period, including four in a row between 1998 and 2002. This period of success came to an end when Barnstaple suffered consecutive relegations to fall to the lowest level in the club's history so far, dropping to Western Counties West (tier 7) by 2005. Thankfully, the club quickly righted itself and three seasons (and two promotions) later found themselves back in South West 1. This climb back up the leagues also coincided with repeated Devon Cup success, with four titles won in a row between 2008 and 2011. In 2007, Jerry Collins, former New Zealand captain, played a game for Barnstaple's 2nd team while visiting family in the Devon town, and later wore the club's socks when playing for the Barbarians against South Africa on 1 December 2007.

Barnstaple stabilised itself in tier 5 as it became known as National League 3 South West. The club continued to play in this division up until the 2015–16 season when they won the promotion play-off game away at Tonbridge Juddians, reaching National League 2 South, which at tier 4 was the highest level reached in the club's league history to date. In 2016–17 Barnstaple finished 14th of 16 teams in the division, but were reprieved from relegation by the collapse of London Welsh in the RFU Championship. Barnstaple recorded 9 wins and 1 draw from 30 games, despite having lost 7 of their first 8 games of the season, as they struggled to adjust to the higher standard of rugby in the national leagues. The end of this season saw the retirement of veteran loosehead prop Mark Berry, who debuted during the Devon Cup winning season of 1998.

In 2017–18 Barnstaple again finished in 14th place, this time being relegated to (the newly named) South West Premier. Relegation came despite Barnstaple winning 10 games and drawing one, meaning they recorded more wins than each of the two teams placed immediately above them. A lack of try bonus points proved costly, as did the home defeats to Cinderford and Chinnor, who finished first and second in the league respectively. In both games Barnstaple led after 80 minutes were played, but lost to last minute scores by the visitors. The season was also notable for including the 250th first team appearance of captain Winston James and the 200th for Will Topps. 

Back at level 5 of the RFU's pyramid in 2018–19, Barnstaple bounced back well and finished the season in second place behind champions Bournemouth. This qualified Barnstaple for another promotion play-off, this time in Essex at Westcliff RFC. However, the trip was not a fruitful one, with a depleted Barnstaple side losing heavily. Barnstaple did lift silverware this season however, winning the Devon Cup final at home against Exmouth thanks in part to hat tricks from Winston James and Will Topps. 

Having remained in the South West Premier division in 2019–20 Barnstaple again mounted a promotion bid and were top of the table, requiring 8 match points from their remaining three games (a possible 15 points) when the global pandemic Coronavirus caused the suspension of all rugby in England on 16 March. Barnstaple were also top of the Devon Senior Cup standings and in prime position to secure a second successive home final at the time of the suspension. Following the league restructuring of National 2 South into two leagues West and East, 2022–23 season see's Barnstaple Chiefs playing along the M5 corridor in National 2 West while Barnstaple Athletic find themselves playing in a competitive league for the first time as they begin the 2022–23 season in Counties 2 Tribute Devon.

League table

Ground
Barnstaple's ground of Pottington Road is situated on the road of the same name, next door to Barnstaple Town Football Club. It is located in town on the north bank of the River Taw, and is about 20–30 minutes' walk from Barnstaple railway station, which is across the river to the south. The rugby ground consists of a main stand next to the club-house, a smaller stand on the opposite side, and along with the main pitch there are three alternative pitches for second XV and colts games, as well as a couple of smaller pitches suitable for younger age ranges/minis. Parking is available at the ground for 100+ cars but space can be limited so alternative parking nearby in town followed by a short walk may be necessary on busy days. The current capacity of the ground is approximately 2,000, which includes around 575 seated (450 in the main stand, 150 in the stand opposite), with the rest standing. This capacity figure is representative of the sell-out crowd experienced against local rivals Bideford Rugby Football Club in the 2016 festive fixture between the two sides.

Season summary

Honours
 Devon Senior Cup winners (13): 1894, 1926, 1928, 1997, 1999, 2000, 2001, 2002, 2005, 2008, 2009, 2010, 2019
 Western Counties West champions: 2006–07
 South West 2 (east v west) promotion play-off winner: 2007–08
 Devon Senior Plate winner: 2011
 National League 3 (south-east v south-west) promotion play-off winner: 2015–16
 South West Premier champions: 2019–20

Notable former players
 Cecil Pritchard – capped 8 times by Wales in the 1920s. Played part of his career at Barnstaple and Torquay Athletic when he moved to the south-west from his home country. Died in 1966.

 Jerry Collins - New Zealand All Black's international 2007

 Ben Vellacott - Scotland international 2022

See also
 Devon RFU

Notes

References

English rugby union teams
Rugby clubs established in 1877
Rugby union in Devon
Sport in Barnstaple
1877 establishments in England